Seven Sisters Mountain is a  mountain summit located in the Canadian Rockies of Alberta, Canada.

Description

The mountain is set near the southern end of the High Rock Range. Precipitation runoff from the mountain drains west to Allison Creek and east to McGillivray Creek which are both tributaries of the nearby Crowsnest River.

History

This landform was originally named "The Steeples" by the Palliser expedition. The mountain's present toponym was officially adopted in 1978 by the Geographical Names Board of Canada. The descriptive name is attributable to its seven distinct towers and pinnacles.

The first ascent of the summit was made in 1951 by Bruno Engler.

Geology
Seven Sisters Mountain is composed of limestone and shale of Late Devonian to Early Mississippian age. The thrust sheet has since been cut through by erosion along Allison Creek, leaving Seven Sisters Mountain and Crowsnest Mountain standing together as an isolated klippe.

Climate
Based on the Köppen climate classification, the mountain has an alpine subarctic climate with cold, snowy winters, and mild summers. Temperatures can drop below −20 °C with wind chill factors below −30 °C.

Gallery

See also
Geology of Alberta

References

External links
 Seven Sisters Mountain weather forecast
 Bruno Engler: Thecanadianencyclopedia.ca

Two-thousanders of Alberta
Canadian Rockies
Crowsnest Pass, Alberta